Jaime Seoane Valenciano (born 22 January 1997) is a Spanish professional footballer who plays as a midfielder for Getafe CF.

Club career
Born in Madrid, Seoane joined Real Madrid's La Fábrica at the age of nine, from EMF Aluche. Promoted to the reserves for the 2016–17 season, he made his senior debut on 20 August 2016 by starting in a 3–2 Segunda División B home defeat of Real Sociedad B.

On 26 April 2017, Seoane extended his contract with Los Blancos until 2020. He scored his first goal for Castilla on 1 November, scoring his team's second in a 4–1 away routing of Celta de Vigo B.

Seoane made his first team debut on 28 November 2017, coming on as a late substitute for Mateo Kovačić in 2–2 home draw against CF Fuenlabrada, for the season's Copa del Rey. He would resume his career at the club appearing for the B's, however.

On 6 August 2019, Seoane signed a three-year deal with Segunda División side SD Huesca. He made his professional debut twelve days later, replacing Mikel Rico in a 1–0 away defeat of UD Las Palmas.

On 31 January 2020, after appearing rarely, Seoane was loaned to fellow second division side CD Lugo, until June. Upon returning to his parent club, he made his La Liga debut on 13 September, replacing Mikel Rico late into a 1–1 away draw against Villarreal CF.

Seoane scored his first goal in the main category of Spanish football on 30 December 2020, but in a 2–1 loss at RC Celta de Vigo. A regular starter as Huesca immediately returned to the second division, he scored 14 goals during the 2021–22 campaign.

On 1 July 2022, free agent Seoane signed a three-year contract with Getafe CF in the top tier.

Career statistics

References

External links
Real Madrid profile

1997 births
Living people
Footballers from Madrid
Spanish footballers
Association football midfielders
La Liga players
Segunda División players
Segunda División B players
Real Madrid Castilla footballers
Real Madrid CF players
SD Huesca footballers
CD Lugo players
Getafe CF footballers